The West African Nations Cup, also known as CSSA Nations Cup or "Zone 3" Championship, was a football championship held from 1982 to 1987 (not in 1985), but discontinued. Ghana won all editions, and indeed never lost a single match among the 25 they played.
The tournament was unsuccessfully revived in 2001 as WAFU Championship; in 2005 a "WAFU Laurent Gbagbo West African Unity Cup" was organised between four of the better teams of the region, apparently as an invitational tournament so not a proper successor of the tournament of the eighties.

The Supreme Council for Sports in Africa (SCSA) was established in July 1965 in Brazzaville as the Comite Permanent du Sport Africain (CPSA). Its present title was adopted in Bamako on 14 December 1966. Since 3 July 1977, the SCSA has been functioning as a specialised agency of the Organisation of African Unity. The SCSA has its headquarters in Yaoundé, Cameroon.

West African Nations Cup Record

Most West African Nations Cup wins

Statistics

References

External links
West African Nations Cup or "Zone 3" Championship

 
Defunct international association football competitions in Africa
International association football competitions in West Africa
Recurring sporting events established in 1982
Recurring events disestablished in 1987
All-time football league tables

de:Westafrikameisterschaft